El carruaje is a Mexican telenovela produced by Miguel Alemán Velasco for Televisa in 1972.

Cast 
Carlos Monden as Massimiliano D'Asburgo
José Carlos Ruiz as Benito Juarez
Carlos Cámara
María Elena Marqués as Margarita Maza de Juarez
Fernando Mendoza as José Ma. Iglesias
Aarón Hernán as Sebastián Lerdo de Tejada
Andrés García as Tte. Azcárate
Carlos Bracho as Octavio Rivera
Susana Dosamantes as Concepción
Salvador Sánchez
Gerardo del Castillo 
José Chávez
Cristina Moreno
Nelly Menden as Carlota Amalia
German Robles as General Escobedo
David Reynoso as José María
Norma Herrera as Sofia
Ignacio López Tarso as Cura
Anita Blanch as Esperanza

References

External links 

1972 telenovelas
Mexican telenovelas
Televisa telenovelas
Spanish-language telenovelas
1972 Mexican television series debuts
1972 Mexican television series endings